Eleutherodactylus schmidti is a species of frog in the family Eleutherodactylidae endemic to Hispaniola, and found in both the Dominican Republic and Haiti. It is sometimes referred to as the Schmidt's robber frog. It is named in honour of Karl Patterson Schmidt.

Habitat
Its natural habitat is mesic closed-canopy rainforest where it is usually found beside streams.

Conservation
It is threatened by habitat loss, and considered Critically Endangered or possibly extinct.

References

schmidti
Endemic fauna of Hispaniola
Amphibians of the Dominican Republic
Frogs of Haiti
Amphibians described in 1923
Taxonomy articles created by Polbot